The 2015 season Independiente Participate in the Argentine Primera División, Copa Argentina and the Copa Sudamericana .

Club

Kits
 Supplier: Puma SE
 Main Sponsor::  Correo OCA /  
 Secondary Sponsor:  Audifarm Salud

Squad information

Current coaching staff

{|class="wikitable"
|+
! style="background-color:white; color:black;" scope="col"|Position
! style="background-color:white; color:black;" scope="col"|Staff
|-

Transfers

Player In

Total spending:  €127,350,000

Player Out 

Total Income : €2,850,000

Net income:  €124,500,000

Players out on loan

Pre-season

Copa De Oro

Standings

Copa De Avellaneda

Friendly

Summer

Winter

Competitions

Overall

Overview
Updated as of 2 November 2015

Primera División

League table

Relegation table

Liguilla Pre-Libertadores

Results summary

Results by round

Copa Argentina

Round of 64

Round of 32

Round of 16

Copa Sudamericana

Second stage

Round of 16

Quarterfinals

Statistics

Squad statistics

Last updated on 21 November 2015

Goals
Last updated on 20 November 2015

Assists

Last updated on 20 November  2015

Clean sheets

Last updated on 9 November 2015

Disciplinary record

Last updated on 20 November 2015

Penalties
Last updated on 9 November 2015  2015

Overall

Last updated on 20 November 2015

References

External links
 Club Atlético Independiente official web site 

Ind
Club Atlético Independiente seasons